Events in the year 2013 in Slovakia.

Incumbents 
 President – Ivan Gašparovič 
 Prime Minister – Robert Fico (Smer-SD)
 Speaker of the National Council – Pavol Paška (Smer-SD)

Events
10 February – First occurrence of the television series Česko Slovenská SuperStar 2013
6–12 May – The tennis tournament 2013 Empire Slovak Open took place in Trnava.
 25 November – Marian Kotleba of People's Party Our Slovakia wins the election of Governor of Banská Bystrica Region. Kotleba's win was described as a "shock" by political analysts, who attributed it to deep anti-Romani sentiments in the region.

Notable deaths
28 January – Ladislav Pavlovič, football player (born 1926)
1 July – Ján Zlocha, football player (born 1942).
7 September – Marek Špilár, football player (born 1975)
21 September – Peter Solan, film director (born 1929)

References

 
2010s in Slovakia
Slovakia
Slovakia
Years of the 21st century in Slovakia